Greasers are a youth subculture that emerged in the  1950s and early 1960s from predominantly working class and lower-class teenagers and young adults in the United States. The subculture remained prominent into the mid-1960s and was particularly embraced by certain ethnic groups in urban areas, particularly Italian Americans and Latino Americans.

History

Etymology of the term greaser 
The etymology for the term greaser is unknown. It is speculated that the word originated in the late 19th century in the United States as a derogatory label for poor laborers, specifically those of Italian, Greek or Mexican descent. The similar term "greaseball" is a slur for individuals of Italian or Greek descent, though to a lesser extent it has also been used more generally to refer to all Mediterranean, Latino, or Hispanic people. By the time of the Civil War, the words "greaser" and "greaseball" were understood to carry racist and segregationist meanings.
"Greaser" was later used to reference automotive mechanics. It was not used in writing to refer to the American subculture of the mid-20th century until the mid-1960s, though in this sense it still evoked a pejorative ethnic connotation and a relation to machine work. The name was applied to members of the subculture partly because of their characteristic greased-back hair.

Within Greater Baltimore during the 1950s and early 1960s, greasers were colloquially referred to as drapes and drapettes.

Origins of the subculture and rise to popularity 
The greaser subculture may have emerged in the post-World War II era among the motorcycle clubs and street gangs of the late 1940s in the United States, though it was certainly established by the 1950s, when it was increasingly adopted by ethnic urban youth. The original greasers (often coming from “ethnic” backgrounds) were aligned by a feeling of working class and lower class disillusionment with American popular culture either through a lack of economic opportunity in spite of the post-war boom or a marginalization enacted by the general domestic shift towards homogeneity in the 1950s. Most were male, usually ethnic or white working class outsiders, and were often interested in hot rod culture or motorcycling. A handful of middle-class youth were drawn to the subculture for its rebellious attitude.

The weak structural foundation of the greasers can be attributed to the subculture's origins in working-class youth possessing few economic resources with which to participate in American consumerism. Greasers, unlike motorcyclists, did not explicitly have their own interest clubs or publications. As such, there was no business marketing geared specifically towards the group. Their choice in clothing was largely drawn from a common understanding of the empowering aesthetic of working-class attire, rather than a cohesive association with similarly dressed individuals. Many greasers were in motorcycle clubs or in street gangs—and conversely, some gang members and bikers dressed like greasers—though such membership was not necessarily an inherent principle of the subculture.

Ethnically, original greasers were composed mostly of Italian Americans in the Northeast and Mexican American Chicanos in the Southwest. Since both of these groups were mostly olive skinned, the "greaser" label assumed a quasi-racial status that implied an urban, ethnic, lower-class masculinity and delinquency. This development led to an ambiguity in the racial distinction between poor Italian Americans and Puerto Ricans in New York City during the 1950s and 1960s. Greasers were also perceived as being predisposed to perpetrating sexual violence, evoking fear in middle-class males but also titillation in middle-class females.

Decline and modern incarnations 
Though the television show American Bandstand helped to "sanitize" the negative image of greasers in the 1960s and 1970s, sexual promiscuity was still seen as a key component of the modern character. By the mid-1970s, the greaser image had become a quintessential part of 1950s nostalgia and cultural revival.

Culture

Fashion 
The most notable physical characteristic of greasers was the greased-back hairstyles they fashioned for themselves through use of hair products such as pomade or petroleum jelly, which necessitated frequent combing and reshaping to maintain. Males sported coiffures adopted from early rock 'n' roll and rockabilly
performers such as Elvis Presley, among them the Folsom, Pompadour, Elephant's trunk, and Duck's ass, while females commonly backcombed, coiffed, or teased their hair.

Male greasers typically wore loose work pants such as cotton twill trousers, common among the working class; dark slacks, or dark blue Levi's jeans, widely popular among all American youth in the 1950s. The latter were often cuffed over ankle-high black or brown leather boots, including steel-toed engineer or combat boots, Harness boots, work boots, and (especially in the Southwest) cowboy boots. Other footwear choices included Chuck Taylor All-Stars, pointed Italian dress shoes, brothel creepers, and winklepickers. Male shirts were typically solid black or white T-shirts, ringer T-shirts, or sometimes sleeveless undershirts or tank tops (which would have been retailed as underwear). Choices of outerwear included denim or leather jackets (including Perfecto motorcycle jackets). Female greaser dress included leather jackets and risque clothing, such as tight and cropped capris and pedal pushers (broadly popular during the time period).

Music tastes 
In the early 1950s, there was significant greaser interest in doo-wop, a genre of African-American music from the industrial cities of the Northeast that had disseminated to mainstream American music through Italian American performers. Greasers were heavily associated with the culture surrounding rock n' roll, a musical genre that had induced feelings of a moral panic among older middle-class generations during the mid-to-late 1950s, to whom greasers epitomized the connection between rock music and juvenile delinquency professed by several important social and cultural observers of the time.

Portrayal in media and popular culture 

 The first cinematic representation of the greaser subculture was the 1953 film The Wild One. 
 The music group Sha-Na-Na, formed in the late 1960s, models their onstage presence on New York City greasers (the band members themselves were mostly Ivy Leaguers). 
 The 1967 critically-acclaimed young adult novel The Outsiders by S. E. Hinton told the story of a gang of greasers, and was controversial upon release due to its depiction of gang violence. The film adaptation of The Outsiders was released in 1983 and directed by Francis Ford Coppola. 
The 1971 American musical and subsequent 1978 film Grease centers around greasers.
Character "Fonzie" from the American TV show Happy Days is a stereotypical greaser who was frequently seen on his motorcycle, wore a leather jacket, and typified the essence of cool, in contrast to his circle of friends.
Characters Leonard "Lenny" Kosnowski and Andrew "Squiggy" Squiggman from the American sitcom Laverne & Shirley, a spin-off of Happy Days. 
 The 1990 John Waters film Cry-Baby is a camp reminiscence of Baltimore greasers during the 1950s.
 The 2006 video game Bully featured a social hierarchy that included a greaser clique.

See also 
 Rockers, similar subculture in the United Kingdom
 Teddy Boy, a contemporary subculture in the United Kingdom
 Nozem, a similar subculture in the Netherlands
 Raggare, a similar subculture in Sweden
 Bodgies and widgies, a similar subculture in Australia and New Zealand
 Bōsōzoku, a similar subculture in Japan
 Halbstarke, a similar subculture in Germany, Austria and Switzerland
 Guido, a subculture similarly associated with Italian-Americans and featuring similar clothing signifiers
 Nerd, stereotypical term which formed a subculture
 Jock, stereotypical term used for male athletes, often anti-intellectual
 Preppy, another mostly youth subculture

Notes

Citations

References 

 
 
 
 
 
 

Motorcycling subculture in the United States
Subcultures
Italian-American culture
Youth culture in the United States